Pucklechurch was an ancient hundred of Gloucestershire, England. Hundreds originated in the late Saxon period as a subdivision of a county and lasted as administrative divisions until the 19th century.

The hundred comprised the ancient parishes of Pucklechurch, Syston, Cold Ashton, Westerleigh and Abson.

At the time of the Domesday Book, the hundred contained Pucklechurch, Syston and Cold Ashton, plus Codrington and part of Wapley (the two now joined into the parish of Wapley-cum-Codrington) and Doynton, which was later moved to Swineshead Hundred. Neither Westerleigh nor Abson were specifically recorded in the survey.

The name Pucklechurch comes from the parish and manor of the same name, which is derived from either Pucela's church, from a person's name, or from fair church.

References 

Hundreds of Gloucestershire
History of Bristol